The Gary SouthShore RailCats are a professional baseball team based in Gary, Indiana, in the United States. The RailCats are members of the American Association of Professional Baseball, an official Partner League of Major League Baseball. The RailCats started as a member of the Northern League in 2002, operating as a travel team for a season before moving in to U.S. Steel Yard in 2003, where they have played since. In 2011, the team became a member of the modern American Association.

During their time in the Northern League, the RailCats were the only team to ever reach the championship series five years in a row (2005–2009). The RailCats won Northern League championships in 2005 and 2007, and the American Association championship in 2013.

History

Inception (2001) 
On January 23, 2001, the Northern League announced that it had awarded a franchise to Northwest Sports Ventures, LLC.  In June, a limited liability company by the name of Victory Sports Group was officially registered in Missouri, led by Michael A. Tatoian. The city signed a fifteen-year lease with the team ownership for the future baseball stadium. In September 2001, the team was officially named the Gary SouthShore RailCats, drawing its name from both the city's deep history of freight lines and the South Shore Line commuter train (visible over the left field wall at the stadium).

Northern League (2002–2010) 
With stadium construction behind schedule, the RailCats were forced to play their first season entirely on the road. The city of Gary paid a financial penalty for failure to complete the stadium on time, which helped finance their season. Despite this, the club won 35 games, the most ever by a team that played exclusively on the road, and RailCats manager Joe Calfapietra was named the Northern League Manager of the Year.

In 2002, the RailCats signed a ten-year naming rights agreement with United States Steel Corporation for the stadium. Joe Calfapietra resigned as manager citing that he wanted to be closer to home. The RailCats hired former major league All-Star Garry Templeton to manage the team. The RailCats were little more than a pushover, firmly stuck in last place.

Garry Templeton returned as coach for another season leading the Cats in their worst season in 2003. In June, they had a 14-game losing streak which was the longest in Northern League history. They completed the season in last place again securing the record for the most losses for a season in Northern League history. Templeton was not retained for the next season.

Before the 2005 season, the RailCats hired Greg Tagert as manager. Tagert made a number of roster changes, and turned the RailCats from losers to winners almost immediately, ending the first half with a .563 average, the first winning average in team history. The Northern League All-Star Game was held at U.S. Steel Yard. The second half went the same as the first but ended with an upset victory making the worst team in 2004, the 2005 champions. The RailCats beat the Fargo-Moorhead RedHawks to win the title.

Tagert returned as manager in 2006. The Cats were first in their division, second overall for the season. They returned to the championship series to face the RedHawks again. This time losing the title.

Tagert returned for the 2007 season. He proved that he could make the RailCats a legacy team. The RailCats appeared unstoppable all season. Winning first place both halves. The RailCats made it to the championship series against the Calgary Vipers and won their second league title.

Prior to the 2008 season, the Cats signed Tagert to an extended contract to keep him at least until the completion of the 2010 season. Lawyer Patrick A. Salvi and his wife, Lindy, purchased the RailCats. The league contracted to six teams. Due to the size, the league opted to have a single-division full season. Tagert again led the Cats in a winning season, ending in second place. They lost the championship series to the fourth-place Kansas City T-Bones, who beat the first place RedHawks in the playoffs to make it to the series.

The Cats ended the 2009 season in first place, yet again, and made it to the championship season for the fifth-straight season, but lost to the RedHawks.

The 2010 Cats finished in fourth place in the Northern League, their worst place finish in five years.  For the first time since 2004, the RailCats did not reach the championship series, being swept by the RedHawks in the league semifinals.

American Association (2011–present) 
On October 13, 2010, the RailCats left the Northern League, along with the RedHawks, T-Bones, and the Winnipeg Goldeyes to join the American Association for the 2011 season.

In 2020, the RailCats were not selected as one of six teams to participate in a condensed American Association season as a result of the COVID-19 pandemic. They went on hiatus for the 2020 season, and returned to play in 2021.

After finishing in last place in the North Division with a 39-61 record in 2021, Greg Tagert left the organization after 17 years to join the San Francisco Giants organization.

Season-by-season records

Playoffs
2005 season: Defeated St. Paul 3–2 in semifinals; defeated Fargo-Moorhead 3–2 to win championship
2006 season: Defeated Schaumburg 3–2 in semifinals; lost to Fargo-Moorhead 3–1 in championship
2007 season: Defeated Winnipeg 3–2 in semifinals; defeated Calgary 3–2 to win championship
2008 season: Defeated Winnipeg 3–1 in semifinals; lost to Kansas City 3–1 in championship
2009 season: Defeated Kansas City 3–2 in semifinals; lost to Fargo-Moorhead 3–1 in championship
2010 season: Lost to Fargo-Moorhead 3–0 in semifinals
2013 season: Defeated Fargo-Moorhead 3–1 in semifinals; defeated Wichita 3–1 to win championship
2017 season: Lost to Wichita 3–0 in semifinals
2018 season: Lost to St. Paul 3–1 in semifinals

Roster

Notable alumni
Source:

Adron Chambers (2016)
Ben Risinger (2005)
Brad Halsey (2010)
Brad Voyles (2008)
Bubba Carpenter (2002-2003)
Clay Zavada (2013)
Evan Marzilli (2019)
Howard Battle (2003)
James Parr (2014)
Jarrod Patterson (2007)
Jermaine Allensworth (2006-2007)
Jim Crowell (2007)
Jorge de León (2016-2018)
Masato Fukae (2016)
Mitch Glasser (2018)
Nathan Haynes (2006)
Onan Masaoka (2009)
Randall Simon (2010)
Rico Washington (2011-2012)
Tim Byrdak (2003)
Tim Sauter (2005)
Tony Cogan (2007-2009)
Trey Beamon (2004)
Wes Chamberlain (2003)
Yasutomo Kubo (2018)
Zach McClellan (2010)

Retired numbers

References
Specific

General
nlfan.com – yearly league standings and awards

External links

RailCats page on OurSports Central
nlfan.com RailCats Guide

 
Sports in Gary, Indiana
American Association of Professional Baseball teams
Professional baseball teams in Indiana
Northern League (baseball, 1993–2010) teams
Baseball teams established in 2001
2001 establishments in Indiana
Baseball in Chicago